Jean Denis Antoine Caucannier (–1905/06) was a French painter.

Life 
Caucannier was born in Paris in about 1860. He studied under Isidore Pils, Jules Frédéric Ballavoine and Jules Lefebvre.

He painted portraits and genre paintings in oils: an example of the latter is Jeune femme aux glycines (Young woman with wisteria'), now in a private collection. He exhibited a number of genre paintings at the Paris Salon between 1880 and 1905, including: La Femme de Potiphar ('Potiphar's Wife'), La Fourmi ('The Ant') and L'Araignée ('The Spider'). He became a member of the Société des Artistes Français in 1883. According to the Benezit Dictionary of Artists, "His body of work is at times somewhat sickly-sweet, but nonetheless demonstrates an ability to capture light effects."

He died in Paris in 1905 or 1906.

Notes

References 

 Catrin, Ritter (2021). "Caucaunier, Jean-Denis-Antoine". In Andreas Beyer, Bénédicte Savoy, Wolf Tegethoff (eds.). Allgemeines Künstlerlexikon Online. Berlin, New York: K. G. Saur. De Gruyter.
 Oliver, Valerie Cassel, ed. (2011). "Caucannier, Jean Denis Antoine". In Benezit Dictionary of Artists. Oxford University Press. Oxford Art Online.
 Thieme, Ulrich, ed. (1912). "Caucannier, Jean Denis Antoine". In Allgemeines Lexikon der Bildenden Künstler von der Antike bis zur Gegenwart, Vol. 6: Carlini–Cioci. Leipzig: E. A. Seemann. p. 196.

External links 

 "Jean Denis Antoine Caucannier (1860-1905)". Catherine La Rose: The Poet of Painting. 3 November 2018. Retrieved 25 April 2022.

1860 births
1900s deaths
19th-century French painters